Guillem Martí Misut (born 5 September 1985), known simply as Guillem, is a Spanish professional footballer who plays for CE Mercadal as a forward.

Club career
Born in Es Mercadal, Balearic Islands, Guillem spent the vast majority of his career in his country in Segunda División B or lower. The exception to this was in the first part of the 2013–14 season, when he played four competitive matches for CD Tenerife. His first in Segunda División was on 18 August 2013, when he came on as a late substitute in a 1–0 away loss against AD Alcorcón.

From 2010 to 2012, Guillem competed in the Austrian Football Bundesliga with SV Ried. His league debut came on 17 July 2010 in a 0–3 home defeat to SK Sturm Graz, and his first goal(s) arrived on 21 August as he scored a hat-trick in a 5–0 away rout of SC Wiener Neustadt.

References

External links

1985 births
Living people
Spanish footballers
Footballers from Menorca
Association football forwards
Segunda División players
Segunda División B players
Tercera División players
Divisiones Regionales de Fútbol players
Real Zaragoza B players
Terrassa FC footballers
CD Tenerife players
SD Huesca footballers
Marbella FC players
CD Guadalajara (Spain) footballers
SD Compostela footballers
Lleida Esportiu footballers
Austrian Football Bundesliga players
SV Ried players
New Radiant S.C. players
Spanish expatriate footballers
Expatriate footballers in Austria
Expatriate footballers in the Maldives
Spanish expatriate sportspeople in Austria